Nakama may refer to:

Nakama (surname)
In Japanese, nakama (仲間) means colleague, compatriot, friend or comrade
Nakama, Fukuoka (中間) is a city in Japan's Fukuoka Prefecture.
Nakama (guilds) (仲間) also refers to a type of Japanese merchant guild of the Edo period.
Nakama (band), Norwegian jazz ensemble comprising Christian Meaas Svendsen, Ayumi Tanaka, Adrian Løseth Waade, and Andreas Wildhagen.